Cassandra Ellen Brock (born 31 January 1991) is an Australian cricketer. She represented Victoria (2010/11–2015/16) and the Melbourne Renegades (2015/16), playing a total of seven List A matches and 20 T20 matches. A right-handed top-order batter, she is also a right-arm leg spinner capable of bowling googly deliveries.

References

External links
 
 

1991 births
Living people
Australian cricketers
Australian women cricketers
Melbourne Renegades (WBBL) cricketers
Victoria women cricketers
Place of birth missing (living people)